Pigritia astuta is a moth in the family Blastobasidae. It was described by Edward Meyrick in 1918. It is found in Colombia.

References

Blastobasidae
Moths described in 1918